Proteuxoa senta is a moth of the family Noctuidae. It is found in South Australia, Tasmania and Victoria.

External links
Australian Faunal Directory

Proteuxoa
Moths of Australia
Moths described in 1902
Taxa named by Oswald Bertram Lower